Closterman is a surname. Notable people with the surname include:

John Closterman (1660–1711), German painter
Winona Closterman (1877–1944), American tennis player

See also
Pierre Clostermann (1921–2006), World War II French fighter pilot
Klosterman
Klostermann
Kloosterman